Arthur Russell (13 March 1886 – 23 August 1972) was a British athlete. He was the winner of the 3,200-meter steeplechase at the 1908 Summer Olympics for Great Britain.

Russell, from Staffordshire, won the British AAA Championships in steeplechase from 1904 to 1906. He won his first AAA title while only 17 years old.

At the London Olympics, Russell competed in the 3,200 metres steeplechase. In the first round, he was one of only two athletes in his heat to finish, easily defeating the other runner.  Russell made the pace in the final for the first mile. Afterwards, Russell and American John Eisele fought for the lead until the bell, when Briton Archie Robertson passed Eisele and was only beaten by two yards by Russell, with Eisele  behind.

Russell was a Walsall brick worker who ran for Walsall Harriers. His gold medal is extremely rare as it is made of solid gold and this was the only time that the 3200-yard event was held.

References

External links
 Arthur Russell at the British Olympic Committee
 

1886 births
1972 deaths
Sportspeople from Staffordshire
British male steeplechase runners
English male steeplechase runners
Olympic athletes of Great Britain
Olympic gold medallists for Great Britain
Athletes (track and field) at the 1908 Summer Olympics
English Olympic medallists
Medalists at the 1908 Summer Olympics
Olympic gold medalists in athletics (track and field)